The Hippo is a South African armoured personnel carrier. Specially designed to be mine resistant, it can carry ten infantrymen and a crew of two. The vehicle's remote-operated turret mounts dual 7.62mm machine guns, but like other improvised fighting vehicles, it is only lightly protected against ballistic threats.

Development history
An interim solution adopted to deal with the threat of land mines deployed by the South West African People's Organization (SWAPO) in northern Ovamboland, the Hippo was simply a blastproof hull fitted to a Bedford RL chassis. Similar to the BTR-152, it offered a staggered troop compartment with seating facing inwards. Vision was restricted to narrow plate glass windows. This layout was universally unpopular and later corrected with the Buffel. There were firing ports for the occupants and a powered machine gun turret could be braced on the open top, though these were seldom fitted. Passengers and crew debussed from a rear deck.

The Hippo Mk1-R was based on a M1961 Bedford truck chassis, which was being phased from South African service in 1974. The Mk1-R was manufactured using mild steel and RB390 armour steel. Some 150 Mk1-R were ordered and shipped to the South African Police in 1974, another 5 being donated to the South-West African authorities. Police units left behind several when they withdrew from Rhodesia in 1976; these were retained by Rhodesian Security Forces and later passed on to the Zimbabwe National Army. In 1978, 120 Hippo Mk1-R conversions of M1970 Bedfords was undertaken for the South African Defence Force, which had assumed responsibility for patrols along the Angolan border and needed a new mine protected vehicle.
The Hippo Mk1-M used ROQ TUFF steel instead of mild steel. The South African Army ordered 402 Mk1-M.

The Hippo served its purpose for the South African Army but it was heavy, and lacked true off-road capability. A new mine-protected vehicle had been designed in April 1976 although it would be another two years before the Buffel would eventually replace the Hippo as the Army's premier troop-carrying mine-protected vehicle.

Variants
Hippo Mk1-R - 1974 model, built on the 1961 Bedford chassis.
Hippo Mk1-M - 1978 model, built on the 1970 Bedford chassis.

Operators
 : South African Defence Force and South African Police
  South-West Africa: South West African Police
 : Rhodesian Security Forces
 : Zimbabwe National Army

See also
Casspir
Crocodile Armoured Personnel Carrier
Buffel
Bullet TCV
Gazelle FRV
MAP45 Armoured Personnel Carrier
MAP75 Armoured Personnel Carrier
Mine Protected Combat Vehicle (MPCV)
Weapons of the Rhodesian Bush War

References

External links
The Truth and Reconciliation Commission: Hippo

Bibliography
 Peter Gerard Locke & Peter David Farquharson Cooke, Fighting Vehicles and Weapons of Rhodesia 1965-80, P&P Publishing, Wellington 1995. 
 Peter Stiff, Taming the Landmine, Galago Publishing Pty Ltd., Alberton (South Africa) 1986. 

Armoured personnel carriers of the Cold War
Armoured personnel carriers of South Africa
Bedford vehicles
Cold War military equipment of South Africa
Internal security vehicles
Military vehicles introduced in the 1970s
Police vehicles
Wheeled armoured personnel carriers